Polytechnic University of the Philippines, Ragay Extension or PUP Ragay is a satellite campus of the Polytechnic University of the Philippines  located in the municipality of Ragay, Camarines Sur, Bicol Region, Philippines. It is situated atop hill that overlooks the municipality of Ragay.

Courses
College of Accountancy (COA)
Bachelor of Science in Accountancy (BSA)

College of Business (CB)
Bachelor in Office Administration (BOA)
Bachelor of Science in Business Administration (BSBA)

College of Economics, Finance, and Politics (CEFP)
Bachelor in Public Administration and  Governance (BPAG)

 College of Computer and Information and Sciences (CCIS) 
Bachelor of Science in Information Technology (BSIT)

'''College of Education (COED)
Bachelor in Secondary Education Major in English (BSEd-English)
Bachelor in Secondary Education Major in Mathematics (BSEd-Math)
Bachelor in Elementary Education (BEEd)

External links
 Polytechnic University of the Philippines Official Website

Polytechnic University of the Philippines
Universities and colleges in Camarines Sur